Film memorabilia are objects considered of value because of their connection to the cinema. These include costumes, props, advertising posters, and scripts, among other things. Fans have always coveted memorabilia, but in recent years, what was once a hobby has mushroomed into big business, with millions of dollars changing hands in auctions held by such top firms as Christie's and Sotheby's. In addition, many popular films have their collectible items sold via independent, online movie memorabilia stores, web auctions, and at film studio charity events.

History of collecting
In the early days, most people sought autographs or original photographs or posters. Collectors had to rely on a handful of news magazines that were full of various sellers offering mail order catalogues or asking to buy bulk lots, or particular items of interest. Occasionally, events would be organized which were structured around a live auction — these, while fewer in number today, still occur, and one can still buy memorabilia in person from trusted sellers on-site. The community was also fairly fragmented, with collectors and dealers spread out across the globe and no real consistent and reliable way to communicate with one another.

Movie studios were slow to recognize the value of their property, "generally viewing the material as junk taking up precious backlot real estate." Often, workers would just take souvenirs or sell items without permission, aware that their employers did not particularly care. One of the more notorious of these was costumer Kent Warner, who amassed a large private collection and made money selling to interested buyers. One of his friends claimed that Warner rescued Humphrey Bogart's Casablanca trench coat, which had been slated for burning.

The turning point came in 1970. Kirk Kerkorian had bought MGM the year before and installed James Thomas Aubrey, Jr. as president. As part of his cost-cutting measures, Aubrey decided to auction off hundreds of thousands of items. The success of this mammoth event made people take notice.

1970 MGM auction
MGM sold the contents of seven sound stages "for a mere $1.5 million" to auctioneer David Weisz. There were over 350,000 costumes alone. Weisz hired Kent Warner to help catalog and prepare for the auction. In the course of his work, Warner found several pairs of the ruby slippers from The Wizard of Oz (it is common practice to make multiple copies of important props). One pair became the centerpiece of the event and sold for a then-unheard-of $15,000 (Warner kept or sold an unknown number of other pairs).

Actress Debbie Reynolds spent $180,000 and "purchased thousands of items", the beginning of her large collection. Weisz "recouped eight times" what he paid "from eager nostalgia enthusiasts."

Among the items sold were:
the Cowardly Lion costume from The Wizard of Oz
the time machine from the 1960 film The Time Machine
the 82 inch and 22 inch (diameter) models of the "United Planets Cruiser C-57D" from Forbidden Planet
Johnny Weissmuller's Tarzan loincloth
the paddle steamer built for the 1951 version of the musical Show Boat

The unsold items, "... truckloads of costume sketches, movie stills and other memorabilia were sent to the MGM Grand Hotel in Las Vegas to be sold in the gift shop and used as hotel decorations." The auction catalogs have now themselves become sought-after collectibles.

2011 Debbie Reynolds auctions
Debbie Reynolds' collection was sold by Profiles in History in two auctions in June and December 2011. The items put up for bid in the first of these auctions included:
Marilyn Monroe's "subway dress", whose skirt is raised by the updraft of a passing subway train in The Seven Year Itch.
one of Charlie Chaplin's trademark bowler hats
an early, unused Arabian motif version of the ruby slippers from The Wizard of Oz
Audrey Hepburn's Ascot dress and hat from My Fair Lady
Charlton Heston's tunic, robe, and accessories from Ben-Hur

On June 18, 2011, the subway dress sold for $4.6 million, far in excess of pre-auction estimates of $1–2 million. Another Monroe dress, worn in Gentlemen Prefer Blondes, fetched $1.2 million; it had been expected to go for $200,000 to $300,000. Estimated at $60,000 to $80,000, a blue cotton dress Judy Garland used in test shots for The Wizard of Oz went for $910,000. In total, the auction grossed $22.8 million.

In the second Reynolds auction, on December 3, 2011, a still-functioning Panavision PSR 35mm camera used to film Star Wars went for $625,000, breaking records for Star Wars memorabilia and vintage cameras.

Influence of the internet
In the early days of the internet, the larger community began to get in touch with one another through UseNet newsgroups (for example, alt.binaries.pictures.movie-posters). As the internet grew, collectors began communicating in ways never thought possible. In 1995, popular on-line email group MoPo was formed, creating a central place for people to keep in touch about things and events important to the community. This group continues to provide information to new and old collectors alike.

By 1997, the community had changed forever. eBay was quickly becoming the alternative marketplace after two years of steady growth. Professional sellers took notice, causing many to close their bricks-and-mortar businesses and focus their attention completely on internet sites and the future of the on-line marketplace.

In the early days of internet selling, prices varied widely. One could find posters normally valued in the hundreds of dollars selling for twenty dollars, or, alternatively, find posters normally valued at twenty dollars going for a hundred or more. Today, the market place for film memorabilia has mostly stabilised. While one can see a rare film poster go for large amounts, it is far more common to find that items are priced either at or near market value, or are bid up to that point.

Types
Film posters
Lobby cards
Still photos
Autographs
Film props
Costumes
Pressbooks and presskits
Programmes
Heralds
Glass slides
Industry magazines and related material
Scripts, storyboards, and original concept art
Promotional material of any kind
Commercial collectibles

Notable examples

Several pairs of the ruby slippers from The Wizard of Oz are known to exist. One pair is on permanent display at the National Museum of American History, several others are in the hands of private collectors, and one pair was stolen in 2005. The last auction price, in 2000, was $666,000. Also, the black hat belonging to the Wicked Witch of the West sold for $33,000 in 1988 and $197,400 in 2008.
There were several statuettes made for the 1941 The Maltese Falcon — two lead figures weighing  each, and a seven-pound (3.2 kg), more finely crafted, resin model — all handled by Humphrey Bogart. Christie's auctioned one of the lead figures, part of the estate of actor William Conrad, on December 6, 1994; it was purchased for $398,500 by Ronald Winston, president of Harry Winston, Inc. Within two years, Winston had resold the prop "at an enormous profit" — for as much as $1 million — to an unknown European collector. On November 25, 2013, Bonhams, in association with TCM, sold the other lead figure, the only one confirmed to have appeared in the movie, for over $4 million, including the buyers fee. This version has a prop number WB 90067. (See also The Maltese Falcon.)
On November 24, 2014, the piano on which Sam plays "As Time Goes By" in Rick's Café Américain (and in which Rick hides the letters of transit) was sold for $2,900,000 (the buyer's premium bringing the total to $3,413,000) by Bonhams in New York City. In the same auction, the only known surviving copy of the transit papers, though apparently not used onscreen, went for $118,750 (including buyer's premium).
Audrey Hepburn was not only a celebrated actress, but also a fashion icon. In 2006, her "little black dress" from Breakfast at Tiffany's (plus a few other minor items) fetched £467,200 ($923,187) for the City of Joy Foundation.
Steven Spielberg paid $60,500 (including 10% commission) in June 1982 for a "Rosebud" sled from Citizen Kane. Orson Welles stated in a telephone interview that there were three made of balsa (as is Spielberg's purchase) that were intended to be burned in the final scene, and one made of hardwood for the beginning of the film. On December 15, 1996, the hardwood sled was sold to an anonymous bidder in Los Angeles for $233,500.
The white suit worn by John Travolta in Saturday Night Fever was purchased by film critic Gene Siskel in a charity auction. In June 1995 it was auctioned at Christie's for $145,500.

References

External links
Discover a Hobby: Learn About Movie Memorabilia Collecting